Georgios Bletsas (born 2 May 1995) is a Greek professional footballer who plays as a defensive midfielder for Super League 2 club Veria.

Honours
Veria
Gamma Ethniki: 2018–19

References

1995 births
Living people
Greek footballers
Super League Greece players
Football League (Greece) players
Gamma Ethniki players
PAS Giannina F.C. players
Kalamata F.C. players
A.P.S. Zakynthos players
Panionios F.C. players
Iraklis Thessaloniki F.C. players
Veria F.C. players
Veria NFC players
Association football midfielders
Footballers from Ioannina